Timur Gadzhiyevich Bogatyryov (born 4 August 1965) is a former Russian professional footballer.

Club career
He made his professional debut in the Soviet Second League in 1989 for FC Salyut Belgorod.

He played 6 seasons in the Russian Premier League with FC Zhemchuzhina Sochi.

References

1965 births
People from Kaspiysk
Living people
Soviet footballers
Association football forwards
Russian footballers
FC Salyut Belgorod players
FC Zhemchuzhina Sochi players
FC Kuban Krasnodar players
FC Akhmat Grozny players
Russian Premier League players
Russian football managers
Sportspeople from Dagestan